The Roman Catholic Diocese of Caratinga is a diocese located in the city of Caratinga in the Ecclesiastical province of Mariana in Brazil.

History
 15 December 1915: Established as Diocese of Caratinga from the Diocese of Amazonas

Bishops
 Bishops of Caratinga (Roman rite)
Joaquim Mamede da Silva Leite † (28 June 1918), did not take effect
Manuel Nogueira Duarte † (4 April 1918), did not take effect
Carloto Fernandes da Silva Távora † (18 December 1919 - 29 November 1933) Died
José Maria Parreira Lara † (28 September 1934 - 8 August 1936) Died
João Batista Cavati, C.M. † (30 July 1938 - 20 October 1956) Resigned
José Eugênio Corrêa † (19 August 1957 - 27 November 1978) Resigned
Hélio Gonçalves Heleno † (27 November 1978 - 16 February 2011) Resigned
Emanuel Messias de Oliveira (16 February 2011 – present)

Other priests of this diocese who became bishops
Odilon Guimarães Moreira, appointed Auxiliary Bishop of Vitória, Espirito Santo in 1999
Paulo Mendes Peixoto, appointed Bishop of São José do Rio Preto, São Paulo in 2005
José Moreira Bastos Neto, appointed Bishop of Três Lagoas, Mato Grosso do Sul in 2009

References

 GCatholic.org
 Catholic Hierarchy

Roman Catholic dioceses in Brazil
Christian organizations established in 1915
Caratinga, Roman Catholic Diocese of
Roman Catholic dioceses and prelatures established in the 20th century